Augusto Daolio (February 18, 1947 – October 7, 1992) was an Italian singer, poet, and painter. He is the founding member and frontman of I Nomadi band.

Daolio was born in Novellara, Emilia-Romagna.

He founded Nomadi in 1963, together with Beppe Carletti, Franco Midili, Leonardo Manfredini, Gualtiero Gelmini and Antonio Campari, remaining the historical co-leader of the band together with Carletti.

He died in Novellara on October 7, 1992, aged 45, from an aggressive form of lung cancer.

See also
I Nomadi

External links
Association "Augusto for Life" 

1947 births
1992 deaths
People from the Province of Reggio Emilia
Deaths from lung cancer in Emilia-Romagna
20th-century Italian male singers